The men's 300 m rifle three positions was a shooting sports event held as part of the Shooting programs at the 1920 Summer Olympics programme. It was the fourth appearance of the 300 metre rifle three positions event at an Olympic Games. The competition was held on 31 July 1920, with 70 shooters from 14 nations competing. The event was won by Morris Fisher of the United States, the nation's first victory in the event. Niels Larsen of Denmark earned silver (the first man to win multiple medals in the event, adding to his 1912 bronze), while Østen Østensen of Norway took bronze.

Background

This was the fourth appearance of the men's 300 metre three-positions rifle event, which was held 11 times between 1900 and 1972. Seven of the top 10 shooters from 1912 returned: gold medalist Paul Colas of France, silver medalist Lars Jørgen Madsen of Denmark (who had also competed in 1900 and 1908), bronze medalist Niels Larsen of Denmark, fourth-place finisher Hugo Johansson of Sweden, fifth-place finisher Gudbrand Skatteboe of Norway, seventh-place finisher (and 1908 gold medalist) Albert Helgerud of Norway, and tenth-place finisher Erik Blomqvist of Sweden.

Czechoslovakia, Greece, Italy, and Spain made their debut in the event. Denmark, France, and Norway each made their fourth appearance, the only nations to have competed at every appearance of the event to date.

Participating nations and athletes

The scores are only known for the shooters of the best eight nations, and so according to sports-reference.com 40 shooters from 8 nations participated in this event. However the scores for the Men's team free rifle uses the scores from this event (the summed score of the five athletes form each nation). Because these events were contested concurrently, shooters that competed in the team event should have competed automatically in this event. In that case 5 athletes from Italy, Spain, Belgium, Greece, Czechoslovakia and South Africa would also have competed in this event, making 70 athletes from 14 nations.

Competition format

The competition had each shooter fire 120 shots, 40 shots in each of three positions: prone, standing, and kneeling (with sitting permitted instead in 1920). The target was 1 metre in diameter, with 10 scoring rings; targets were set at a distance of 300 metres. Thus, the maximum score possible was 1200 points. Any rifle could be used. As in 1900 (but not 1908 or 1912), the scores for each individual were summed to give a team score.

Records

Prior to the competition, the existing world and Olympic records were as follows.

The top two shooters in 1920 broke the Olympic record. Morris Fisher ended with the new record, at 996 points; Niels Larsen had 989.

Schedule

Results

The scores are only known for the shooters of the best eight nations. The maximum score was 1200. The scores of this event were summed to the result of the team free rifle competition.

References

External links
 Official Report
 

Shooting at the 1920 Summer Olympics
Men's 300m 3 positions